Roller Sports events were held from 30 September 2022 to 2 October 2022 at Sabarmati Riverfront Venue 3, Ahmedabad.

Medal table

Medal summary 
Men

References 

2022 in roller sports
2022 National Games of India